Haditha is a city in Iraq.

Haditha or al-Haditha may also refer to:

Geography

Iraq
Haditha District, a district in Anbar Province, Iraq
Haditha Dam, a Dam on the Euphrates in central Iraq
Hdatta, also known as Haditha, a medieval city in Upper Mesopotamia

Lebanon
Haddatha,  a village in Southern Lebanon

Palestine
Hadatha, the former Palestinian village in Tiberias Sub-district
Al-Haditha, Ramle, the former Palestinian village in Ramle  Sub-district

Saudi-Arabia
Al-Haditha, Saudi Arabia, a village in Saudi Arabia

Others 
Battle of Haditha, a battle fought between U.S. forces and Iraqi insurgents in early August 2005
Haditha massacre or Haditha killings, an incident in which 24 Iraqis were killed by United States Marines on 19 November 2005
Battle for Haditha, a 2007 film based on the Haditha killings

See also
Hadid (disambiguation)
Hadidi (disambiguation)
Hadith